Notable events of 2005 in webcomics.

Events

Clickburg, the first webcomic exhibition, was held in the Netherlands.
The Eisner Awards, the most prestigious comics ceremony, introduced a "Best Digital Comic" category.
Joey Manley launches Webcomics Nation, a hosting and automation service for webcomics.
Naver Corporation launched WEBTOON in South Korea, as Line Webtoon.
The first edition of blog BD festival Festiblog was held in Paris.
Uclick launches online comic distribution portal GoComics.
The business model of Modern Tales changed drastically, incorporating an online advertising strategy, effectively making all archives freely available.

Awards
Web Cartoonist's Choice Awards, "Outstanding Comic" won by John Allison's Scary Go Round.
Clickburg Webcomic Awards, won by Han Hoogerbrugge, Jean-Marc van Tol, and Geza Dirks.
Ignatz Awards, "Outstanding Online Comic" won by Nicholas Gurewitch's The Perry Bible Fellowship.
Eisner Awards, "Best Digital Comic" won by Brian Fies' Mom's Cancer.
Eagle Awards, "Favourite Web-Based Comic" won by Scott Kurtz's PvP.

Webcomics started

 January 1 — Le blog de Frantico by Frantico
 January 12 — Courting Disaster by Brad Guigar
 January 17 — Shortpacked! by David Willis
 January 24 — Aoi House by Adam Arnold and Shiei
 January 26 — Cyanide & Happiness by Kris Wilson, Rob DenBleyker, Matt Melvin, and Dave McElfatrick
 February 2–July 28 — Salamander Dream by Hope Larson
 February 6–April 15 — Magical Adventures in Space by Jeffrey Rowland
 February 21 — Boots and Pup by John Yuskaitis
 March — Inherit the Earth by Allison Hershey
 April 4 — Gunnerkrigg Court by Tom Siddell
 April 18 — Girl Genius by Phil Foglio and Kaja Foglio
 April 26 — Whispered Apologies by various authors
 May 1 — Concerned: The Half-Life and Death of Gordon Frohman by Christopher C. Livingston
 May 1 — TIN The Incompetent Ninja by David Stanworth
 May 23 — Starslip Crisis by Kristofer Straub
 May 23 — Ugly Hill by Paul Southworth
 May 30 — Evil Inc. by Brad Guigar
 June 1 — Happy Hour by Jim Kohl and Phil Kriser
 June 5 — Templar, Arizona by Spike Trotman
 June 8 — Dresden Codak by Aaron Diaz
 June 26 — Goblins by Tarol Hunt
 June — Timing by Kang Full
 July 4 — Wally and Osborne by Tyler Martin
 July 10 — Multiplex by Gordon McAlpin
 August — Crying Macho Man by Jose Cabrera
 September 29 — xkcd by Randall Munroe
 November 17 — Dueling Analogs by Steve Napierski
 November 30 — Raruto by Jesús García Ferrer (JesuLink)
 December 5 — Winger by Carson Fire
 December 9 — Sam & Max by Steve Purcell
 ¡Eh, tío! by Sergio S. Morán
 Finder by Carla Speed McNeil
 Jesus and Mo by Mohammed Jones

Webcomics ended
 Argon Zark! by Charley Parker, 1995 – 2005
 Roomies! by David Willis, 1997 – 2005
 Greystone Inn by Brad Guigar, 2000 – 2005
 Buttercup Festival by Elliot G. Garbauskas, 2002 – 2005
 Queen of Wands by Aeire, 2002 – 2005

References

 
Webcomics by year